John Dent (1821–1892) was an English merchant of the then prominent trading firm Dent & Co. and member of the Legislative Council of Hong Kong and Chairman of the Shanghai Municipal Council.

Biography
John was born in 1821 in the Far East merchant family. His uncle Thomas Dent started the Dent & Co. in Canton in the 1820s and his two other uncles Lancelot and Wilkinson Dent were the heads of the firm and led to the firm into one of the largest hongs in China and early colonial Hong Kong.

John Dent joined Dent & Co. and became the senior partner of the firm. In 1863, he was elected the third chairman of the Hong Kong General Chamber of Commerce. He played a leading role in the establishment of the Hongkong and Shanghai Banking Company and was one of the proprietors when the bank was incorporated in 1866. He returned to London in 1864 with a fortune of about £800,000, which he amassed in China, and joined the formation of the Blakely Ordnance Company and became the chairman of the firm with the capital of £120 000.

John Dent was appointed an unofficial Justice of the Peace in 1844. In 1857, he was appointed member of the Legislative Council of Hong Kong. He resigned from the office in 1861 and replaced by Francis Chomley, another partner of the Dent & Co.. He was reappointed to the Legislative Council in 1866. He resigned in 1867 after his firm went bankrupt in 1867 and was replaced by Phineas Ryrie. Dent was also appointed consul for the Kingdom of Sardinia and later the Kingdom of Italy in Hong Kong from 1858 to 1867.

Dent & Co. went bankrupt in 1867 during the worldwide financial crisis which originated in 1866 in London. They suffered a loss of no less than £200,000 by the malversations of a Portuguese clerk in their employment at Shanghai who was sentenced to seven years imprisonment. The petition for adjudication of bankruptcy was filed in the Supreme Court of Hong Kong on 29 June 1867. Dent had to remove his headquarters in Shanghai and sold the Dent Building to the Hong Kong Hotel Co.

Dent was noted for his luxurious lifestyle which he was reported to have spent £10,000 on a racehorse to win the Hong Kong cup. The clock-tower at the end of Pedder Street and the entrance to Queen's Road in Central, Hong Kong, erected by public subscription in 1862, was at the suggestion of John Dent, whose original design had to be stripped of its original decorative features, owing to the waning enthusiasm of the community. John Dent also donated a fountain at the entrance of the old City Hall.

In 1870, Dent recommenced business as Dent & Co in Shanghai in the premises previously occupied by his old firm. In April 1871 he became the Chairman of the Shanghai Municipal Council and served in that position until January 1873

References

1821 births
1892 deaths
British expatriates in Hong Kong
Hong Kong businesspeople
Chairmen of HSBC
Members of the Legislative Council of Hong Kong
Chairmen of the Shanghai Municipal Council